Cada Vez que Nos Miramos is a 1970 flamenco album by Camarón de la Isla and Paco de Lucía.

Officially, the simple descriptive title for five of the first six collaborative albums by these two performers, including this one (their second), was El Camarón de la Isla con la colaboración especial de Paco de Lucía, but each of the five came to be identified by the title of their first track.

Tracks
 Cada Vez Que Nos Miramos (Solea) – (Paco de Lucía / Antonio Fernández Díaz) – 3:47
 Y No Llegastes A Quererme (Granaina) – (Paco de Lucía / Antonio Fernández Díaz) – 2:58
 Ante El Altar Me Jurastes (Tangos) – (Paco de Lucía / Antonio Fernández Díaz) – 3:52 
 Moral (Fandangos) – (Paco de Lucía / Antonio Fernández Díaz) – 2:17
 Le Andan Hablando (Bulerías) 4:09
 Vas A Conseguir Tres Cosas (Fandangos de Huelva) 1:57
 Jardín De Belleza (Romera) 2:33
 Sube Al Enganche (Taranto) 2:20
 Donde Una Ermita Poner (Fandangos) 2:32
 A Los Santos Del Cielo (Seguiriyas)– (Paco de Lucía / Antonio Fernández Díaz) – 4:08
 Soy Grande Por Ser Gitano (Bulerías) 3:18
 Al Gurugu Guruguero (Tientos) 3:19

Credits 

 Flamenco Guitar – Paco De Lucía
 Guitar [Second] – Ramón De Algeciras (tracks: 3,5,6,7,11)
 Vocals – Camarón De La Isla

References

1970 albums
Paco de Lucía albums
Camarón de la Isla albums